Korbinian Burger (born 27 April 1995) is a German professional footballer who plays as a centre-back for  club Erzgebirge Aue.

Career
On 15 June 2022, Burger joined Erzgebirge Aue on a two-year contract.

References

1995 births
Living people
People from Cham, Germany
Sportspeople from the Upper Palatinate
Footballers from Bavaria
German footballers
Association football defenders
TSV 1860 Munich II players
FC Bayern Munich II players
SpVgg Greuther Fürth II players
SpVgg Greuther Fürth players
SG Sonnenhof Großaspach players
1. FC Magdeburg players
FC Erzgebirge Aue players
3. Liga players
Regionalliga players